Sirippoli is a Tamil-language comedy channel which was launched in 2009. The channel, owned by Kalaignar TV Private Limited.

References 

Tamil-language television stations
Tamil-language television channels
Television stations in Chennai
Television channels and stations established in 2009
2009 establishments in Tamil Nadu
Comedy television channels in India